Tuksanbay (Tuqhanbay) is a rural locality (a selo) in Polyakovsky Selsoviet, Davlekanovsky District, Bashkortostan, Russia. The population was 5 as of 2010.

Geography 
Tuksanbay is located 14 km northeast of Davlekanovo (the district's administrative centre) by road. Vperyod is the nearest rural locality.

References 

Rural localities in Davlekanovsky District